Moshing is a form of concert dancing.

Mosh or MOSH may also refer to:
 MOSH = Mineral Oil Saturated Hydrocarbon (cf. POSH, MOAH)
 MOSH (Nokia), Nokia's content-sharing site
 Mosh (software), an Internet remote terminal application
 "Mosh" (song), a song by Eminem
 Museum of Science and History, a museum in Jacksonville, Florida
 Mosh (wrestler), professional wrestler
Mosh (model), Russian-American alternative model and burlesque performer
 Maryland Occupational Safety and Health, a division of the Maryland Department of Labor, Licensing and Regulation

See also 
 Moix, pronounced as "mosh" in Catalan